The 2022–23 Brooklyn Nets season is the 47th season of the franchise in the National Basketball Association (NBA), 56th season overall, and its 11th season playing in the New York City borough of Brooklyn.

On November 1, 2022, Steve Nash was fired as the Nets' head coach after the team started the season with a 2–5 record and was replaced by Jacque Vaughn on an interim basis. On November 9, Vaughn was named the new head coach.

Draft

The Nets did not hold any picks in the 2022 NBA draft.

Roster

Standings

Division

Conference

Game log

Preseason
The preseason schedule was announced on July 18, 2022.

|- style="background:#fbb;"
| 1
| October 3
| Philadelphia
| 
| Durant (13)
| 7 players (4) 
| Simmons (5)
| Barclays Center13,250
| 0–1
|- style="background:#fbb;"
| 2
| October 6
| Miami
| 
| Durant (22)
| Simmons (10)
| Chiozza, Simmons (4)
| Barclays Center14,058
| 0–2
|- style="background:#bfb;"
| 3
| October 12
| @ Milwaukee
| 
| Irving (23)
| Claxton (9)
| Simmons (10)
| Fiserv Forum12,544
| 1–2
|- style="background:#bfb;"
| 4
| October 14
| @ Minnesota
| 
| Irving (26)
| Sharpe (13)
| Durant, Summons (6)
| Target Center12,787
| 2–2

Regular season
The regular season schedule was released on August 17, 2022.

|- style="background:#fbb;"
| 1
| October 19
| New Orleans
| 
| Durant (32)
| Claxton (10)
| Irving, Simmons (5)
| Barclays Center18,003
| 0–1
|- style="background:#bfb;"
| 2
| October 21
| Toronto
| 
| Irving (30)
| Claxton (11)
| Simmons (8)
| Barclays Center17,732
| 1–1
|- style="background:#fbb;"
| 3
| October 24
| @ Memphis
| 
| Durant, Irving (37)
| Irving (8)
| Simmons (8)
| FedExForum17,392
| 1–2
|- style="background:#fbb;"
| 4
| October 26
| @ Milwaukee
| 
| Durant (33)
| Irving (9)
| Simmons (9)
| Fiserv Forum17,341
| 1–3
|- style="background:#fbb;"
| 5
| October 27
| Dallas
| 
| Irving (39)
| Simmons (8)
| Durant (5)
| Barclays Center18,039
| 1–4
|- style="background:#fbb;"
| 6
| October 29
| Indiana
| 
| Irving (35)
| Claxton (9)
| Simmons (9)
| Barclays Center17,732
| 1–5
|- style="background:#bfb;"
| 7
| October 31
| Indiana
| 
| Durant (36)
| Claxton, Durant (9)
| Durant (7)
| Barclays Center15,770
| 2–5

|- style="background:#fbb;"
| 8
| November 1
| Chicago
| 
| Durant (32)
| Claxton (10)
| Irving (7)
| Barclays Center17,732
| 2–6
|- style="background:#bfb;"
| 9
| November 4
| @ Washington
| 
| Durant (28)
| Claxton, Durant (9)
| Durant (11)
| Capital One Arena17,258
| 3–6
|- style="background:#bfb;"
| 10
| November 5
| @ Charlotte
| 
| Durant (27)
| Claxton (9)
| O'Neale (5)
| Spectrum Center19,398
| 4–6
|- style="background:#fbb;"
| 11
| November 7
| @ Dallas
| 
| Durant (26)
| Claxton (14)
| O'Neale (8)
| American Airlines Center20,011
| 4–7
|- style="background:#bfb;"
| 12
| November 9
| New York
| 
| Durant (29)
| Durant (12)
| Durant (12)
| Barclays Center18,156
| 5–7
|- style="background:#bfb;"
| 13
| November 12
| @ L.A. Clippers
| 
| Durant (27)
| Claxton (14)
| Sumner (4)
| Crypto.com Arena17,777
| 6–7
|- style="background:#fbb;"
| 14
| November 13
| @ L.A. Lakers
| 
| Durant (31)
| Durant (9)
| Durant (7)
| Crypto.com Arena18,040
| 6–8
|- style="background:#fbb;"
| 15
| November 15
| @ Sacramento
| 
| Durant (27)
| Simmons (5)
| Durant (6)
| Golden 1 Center17,611
| 6–9
|- style="background:#bfb;"
| 16
| November 17
| @ Portland
| 
| Durant (35)
| Simmons (13)
| O'Neale (11)
| Moda Center19,393
| 7–9
|- style="background:#bfb;"
| 17
| November 20
| Memphis
| 
| Durant (26)
| Simmons (8)
| O'Neale (8)
| Barclays Center18,241
| 8–9
|- style="background:#fbb;"
| 18
| November 22
| @ Philadelphia
| 
| Irving (23)
| O'Neale, Simmons (7)
| Simmons (11)
| Wells Fargo Center20,184
| 8–10
|- style="background:#bfb;"
| 19
| November 23
| @ Toronto
| 
| Irving (29)
| Claxton (12)
| O'Neale (7)
| Scotiabank Arena19,800
| 9–10
|- style="background:#fbb;"
| 20
| November 25
| @ Indiana
| 
| Durant (36)
| Claxton (11)
| Durant (8)
| Gainbridge Fieldhouse15,404
| 9–11
|- style="background:#bfb;"
| 21
| November 27
| Portland
| 
| Durant (31)
| Simmons (12)
| Simmons (8)
| Barclays Center17,732
| 10–11
|- style="background:#bfb;"
| 22
| November 28
| Orlando
| 
| Durant (45)
| Claxton (13)
| Durant, O'Neale (5)
| Barclays Center15,704
| 11–11
|- style="background:#bfb;"
| 23
| November 30
| Washington
| 
| Durant (39)
| Claxton, O'Neale (8)
| O'Neale (7)
| Barclays Center15,963
| 12–11

|- style="background:#bfb;"
| 24
| December 2
| Toronto
| 
| Irving (27)
| Claxton, Durant (9)
| Durant (7)
| Barclays Center17,732
| 13–11
|- style="background:#fbb;"
| 25
| December 4
| Boston
| 
| Durant (31)
| Claxton (14)
| Durant, Irving (5)
| Barclays Center18,043
| 13–12
|- style="background:#bfb;"
| 26
| December 7
| Charlotte
| 
| Irving (33)
| Durant (9)
| Irving (9)
| Barclays Center16,903
| 14–12
|- style="background:#bfb;"
| 27
| December 9
| Atlanta
| 
| Durant (34)
| Irving (11)
| Simmons (7)
| Barclays Center18,072
| 15–12
|- style="background:#bfb;"
| 28
| December 10
| @ Indiana
| 
| Thomas (33)
| Sharpe (12)
| Mills (6)
| Gainbridge Fieldhouse14,280
| 16–12
|- style="background:#bfb;"
| 29
| December 12
| @ Washington
| 
| Durant (30)
| Durant (9)
| Durant (6)
| Capital One Arena16,090
| 17–12
|- style="background:#bfb;"
| 30
| December 16
| @ Toronto
| 
| Irving (32)
| Claxton (10)
| Irving, Simmons (5)
| Scotiabank Arena19,800
| 18–12
|- style="background:#bfb;"
| 31
| December 18
| @ Detroit
| 
| Durant (43)
| Simmons (8)
| Simmons (8)
| Little Caesars Arena19,488
| 19–12
|- style="background:#bfb;"
| 32
| December 21
| Golden State
| 
| Durant (23)
| Claxton, Durant (7)
| Simmons (8)
| Barclays Center18,026
| 20–12
|- style="background:#bfb;"
| 33
| December 23
| Milwaukee
| 
| Durant (24)
| Simmons (11)
| Simmons (8)
| Barclays Center18,169
| 21–12
|- style="background:#bfb;"
| 34
| December 26
| @ Cleveland
| 
| Durant, Irving (32)
| Durant, Simmons (9)
| Simmons (8)
| Rocket Mortgage FieldHouse19,432
| 22–12
|- style="background:#bfb;"
| 35
| December 28
| @ Atlanta
| 
| Irving (28)
| Durant (16)
| Durant, Irving (8)
| State Farm Arena18,030
| 23–12
|- style="background:#bfb;"
| 36
| December 31
| @ Charlotte
| 
| Irving (28)
| Warren (7)
| O'Neale (6)
| Spectrum Center19,386
| 24–12

|- style="background:#bfb;"
| 37
| January 2
| San Antonio
| 
| Irving (27)
| Irving (8)
| Durant (11)
| Barclays Center18,224
| 25–12
|- style="background:#fbb;"
| 38
| January 4
| @ Chicago
| 
| Durant (44)
| Simmons (9)
| Irving (8)
| United Center21,418
| 25–13
|- style="background:#bfb;"
| 39
| January 6
| @ New Orleans
| 
| Durant (33)
| Durant (10)
| Simmons (10)
| Smoothie King Center18,636
| 26–13
|- style="background:#bfb;"
| 40
| January 8
| @ Miami
| 
| Irving (29)
| Claxton (11)
| Simmons (7)
| FTX Arena19,901
| 27–13
|- style="background:#fbb;"
| 41
| January 12
| Boston
| 
| Irving (24)
| Claxton, Simmons (9)
| Simmons (13)
| Barclays Center18,125
| 27–14
|- style="background:#fbb;"
| 42
| January 15
| Oklahoma City
| 
| Curry (23)
| Claxton (13)
| O'Neale (8)
| Barclays Center18,165
| 27–15
|- style="background:#fbb;"
| 43
| January 17
| @ San Antonio
| 
| Warren (19)
| Claxton (11)
| Simmons (11)
| AT&T Center13,532
| 27–16
|- style="background:#fbb;"
| 44
| January 19
| @ Phoenix
| 
| Irving (30)
| Claxton (11)
| Irving (7)
| Footprint Center17,071
| 27–17
|- style="background:#bfb;"
| 45
| January 20
| @ Utah
| 
| Irving (48)
| Irving (11)
| Irving, O'Neale (6)
| Vivint Arena18,206
| 28–17
|- style="background:#bfb;"
| 46
| January 22
| @ Golden State
| 
| Irving (38)
| Claxton (15)
| Simmons (11)
| Chase Center18,064
| 29–17
|- style="background:#fbb;"
| 47
| January 25
| @ Philadelphia
| 
| Curry (32)
| Claxton (11)
| Irving (10)
| Wells Fargo Center19,772
| 29–18
|- style="background:#fbb;"
| 48
| January 26
| Detroit
| 
| Irving (40)
| Claxton (13)
| Simmons (7)
| Barclays Center17,732
| 29–19
|- style="background:#bfb;"
| 49
| January 28
| New York
| 
| Irving (32)
| Claxton (12)
| Irving (9)
| Barclays Center18,100
| 30–19
|- style="background:#bfb;"
| 50
| January 30
| L.A. Lakers
| 
| Irving (26)
| Sharpe (14)
| Irving (6)
| Barclays Center17,924
| 31–19

|- style="background:#fbb;"
| 51
| February 1
| @ Boston
| 
| Irving (20)
| Sharpe (7)
| Irving, O'Neale (4)
| TD Garden19,156
| 31–20
|- style="background:#bfb;"
| 52
| February 4
| Washington
| 
| Thomas (44)
| Claxton (13)
| Claxton, Thomas (5)
| Barclays Center17,732
| 32–20
|- style="background:#fbb;"
| 53
| February 6
| L.A. Clippers
| 
| Thomas (47)
| Claxton (16)
| Smith (4)
| Barclays Center16,981
| 32–21
|- style="background:#fbb;"
| 54
| February 7
| Phoenix
| 
| Thomas (43)
| Claxton (13)
| O'Neale, Simmons (6)
| Barclays Center17,093
| 32–22
|- style="background:#bfb;"
| 55
| February 9
| Chicago
| 
| Dinwiddie (25)
| Sharpe (12)
| Dinwiddie (6)
| Barclays Center16,938
| 33–22
|- style="background:#fbb;"
| 56
| February 11
| Philadelphia
| 
| Bridges (23)
| Finney-Smith (8)
| Dinwiddie (6)
| Barclays Center17,732
| 33–23
|- style="background:#fbb;"
| 57
| February 13
| @ New York
| 
| Dinwiddie (28)
| Sharpe (8)
| Dinwiddie (4)
| Madison Square Garden19,812
| 33–24
|- style="background:#bfb;"
| 58
| February 15
| Miami
| 
| Bridges (45)
| Claxton (9)
| Bridges, Dinwiddie (5)
| Barclays Center17,963
| 34–24
|- style="background:#fbb;"
| 59
| February 24
| @ Chicago
| 
| Thomas (22)
| Bridges, Claxton, Finney-Smith (6)
| Dinwiddie (5)
| United Center21,286
| 34–25
|- style="background:#fbb;"
| 60
| February 26
| @ Atlanta
| 
| Johnson (27)
| Claxton (11)
| Dinwiddie (8)
| State Farm Arena16,983
| 34–26
|- style="background:#fbb;"
| 61
| February 28
| Milwaukee
| 
| Bridges (31)
| Claxton, Johnson (7)
| Dinwiddie (8)
| Barclays Center17,732
| 34–27

|- style="background:#fbb;"
| 62
| March 1
| @ New York
| 
| Johnson (33)
| Claxton (8)
| Dinwiddie (10)
| Madison Square Garden19,812
| 34–28
|- style="background:#bfb;"
| 63
| March 3
| @ Boston
| 
| Bridges (38)
| Claxton (12)
| Dinwiddie (8)
| TD Garden19,156
| 35–28
|- style="background:#bfb;"
| 64
| March 5
| Charlotte
| 
| Bridges (33)
| Claxton (12)
| Dinwiddie (8)
| Barclays Center17,921
| 36–28
|- style="background:#bfb;"
| 65
| March 7
| @ Houston
| 
| Bridges (30)
| Claxton (13)
| Bridges (5)
| Toyota Center14,833
| 37–28
|- style="background:#fbb;"
| 66
| March 9
| @ Milwaukee
| 
| Mills (23)
| Watanabe (9)
| Smith (5)
| Fiserv Forum17,341
| 37–29
|- style="background:#bfb;"
| 67
| March 10
| @ Minnesota
| 
| Bridges (34)
| O'Neale (15)
| Dinwiddie (11)
| Target Center17,136
| 38–29
|- style="background:#bfb;"
| 68
| March 12
| @ Denver
| 
| Bridges (25)
| Claxton, Dinwiddie, O'Neale (6)
| Dinwiddie (16)
| Ball Arena19,739
| 39–29
|- style="background:#fbb;"
| 69
| March 14
| @ Oklahoma City
| 
| Bridges (34)
| Claxton (12)
| Dinwiddie (11)
| Paycom Center16,976
| 39–30
|- style="background:#fbb;"
| 70
| March 16
| Sacramento
| 
| Bridges (23)
| Claxton (14)
| Dinwiddie (7)
| Barclays Center18,172
| 39–31
|- style="background:#fbb;"
| 71
| March 19
| Denver
| 
| Bridges (23)
| Claxton (8)
| Dinwiddie (11)
| Barclays Center18,235
| 39–32
|- style="background:#;"
| 72
| March 21
| Cleveland
| 
| 
| 
| 
| Barclays Center
| 
|- style="background:#;"
| 73
| March 23
| Cleveland
| 
| 
| 
| 
| Barclays Center
| 
|- style="background:#;"
| 74
| March 25
| @ Miami
| 
| 
| 
| 
| FTX Arena
| 
|- style="background:#;"
| 75
| March 26
| @ Orlando
| 
| 
| 
| 
| Amway Center
| 
|- style="background:#;"
| 76
| March 29
| Houston
| 
| 
| 
| 
| Barclays Center
| 
|- style="background:#;"
| 77
| March 31
| Atlanta
| 
| 
| 
| 
| Barclays Center
| 

|- style="background:#;"
| 78
| April 2
| Utah
| 
| 
| 
| 
| Barclays Center
| 
|- style="background:#;"
| 79
| April 4
| Minnesota
| 
| 
| 
| 
| Barclays Center
| 
|- style="background:#;"
| 80
| April 5
| @ Detroit
| 
| 
| 
| 
| Little Caesars Arena
| 
|- style="background:#;"
| 81
| April 7
| Orlando
| 
| 
| 
| 
| Barclays Center
| 
|- style="background:#;"
| 82
| April 9
| Philadelphia
| 
| 
| 
| 
| Barclays Center
|

Player statistics

Regular season statistics
As of March 19, 2023

|-
| style="text-align:left;"| || 16 || 16 || 34.4 || .496 || .439 || .892 || 4.5 || 2.6 || .9 || .8 || 25.9
|-
| style="text-align:left;"| || 66 || 66 || 29.5 || .708 || .000 || .523 || 9.2 || 1.8 || .8 || 2.5 || 12.6
|-
| style="text-align:left;"| || 53 || 7 || 21.3 || .464 || .409 || .979 || 1.8 || 1.8 || .7 || .1 || 10.0
|-
| style="text-align:left;"| || 16 || 16 || 34.9 || .412 || .296 || .802 || 3.9 || 8.0 || 1.3 || .4 || 17.5
|-
| style="text-align:left;"| || 18 || 0 || 9.6 || .459 || .125 || .556 || 1.1 || .9 || .4 || .1 || 3.4
|-
| style="text-align:left;"| || 39 || 39 || 36.0 || .559 || .376 || .934 || 6.7 || 5.3 || .8 || 1.5 || 29.7
|-
| style="text-align:left;"| || 14 || 1 || 5.6 || .250 || .167 || .500 || 1.0 || .1 || .2 || .1 || 1.1
|-
| style="text-align:left;"| || 17 || 17 || 29.0 || .331 || .272 || .750 || 4.8 || 1.8 || .7 || .4 || 6.5
|-
| style="text-align:left;"| || 64 || 33 || 21.5 || .455 || .422 || .625 || 2.3 || 1.4 || .5 || .2 || 7.7
|-
| style="text-align:left;"| || 40 || 40 || 37.0 || .486 || .374 || .883 || 5.1 || 5.3 || 1.0 || .8 || 27.1
|-
| style="text-align:left;"| || 15 || 15 || 31.0 || .434 || .336 || .800 || 5.0 || 1.7 || 1.5 || .3 || 16.5
|-
| style="text-align:left;"| || 38 || 1 || 13.6 || .420 || .382 || .913 || 1.1 || 1.4 || .4 || .1 || 6.1
|-
| style="text-align:left;"| || 27 || 1 || 10.6 || .402 || .408 || 1.000 || 2.2 || .9 || .3 || .2 || 3.6
|-
| style="text-align:left;"| || 3 || 1 || 14.3 || .167 ||  || .500 || 3.0 || 1.0 || 1.0 || .3 || 1.0
|-
| style="text-align:left;"| || 67 || 52 || 32.1 || .388 || .395 || .738 || 5.0 || 3.7 || .9 || .6 || 8.9
|-
| style="text-align:left;"| || 37 || 2 || 11.1 || .516 || .556 || .625 || 3.8 || .8 || .2 || .6 || 4.1
|-
| style="text-align:left;"| || 42 || 33 || 26.3 || .566 || .000 || .439 || 6.3 || 6.1 || 1.3 || .6 || 6.9
|-
| style="text-align:left;"| || 5 || 0 || 11.4 || .520 || .333 || 1.000 || 1.8 || 2.0 || 1.0 || .2 || 6.2
|-
| style="text-align:left;"| || 48 || 12 || 14.4 || .457 || .357 || .929 || 1.5 || 1.4 || .6 || .2 || 7.4
|-
| style="text-align:left;"| || 52 || 3 || 16.6 || .437 || .375 || .858 || 1.7 || 1.4 || .4 || .1 || 10.3
|-
| style="text-align:left;"| || 26 || 0 || 18.8 || .510 || .333 || .818 || 2.8 || 1.1 || .6 || .3 || 9.5
|-
| style="text-align:left;"| || 48 || 0 || 17.2 || .507 || .461 || .756 || 2.5 || .9 || .4 || .3 || 6.0
|-
| style="text-align:left;"| || 1 || 0 || 5.0 ||  ||  ||  || 1.0 || .0 || .0 || .0 || .0

Transactions

Trades

Additions

Subtractions

References

External links
 2022–23 Brooklyn Nets at Basketball-Reference.com

Brooklyn Nets
Brooklyn Nets seasons
Brooklyn Nets
Brooklyn Nets
2020s in Brooklyn
Prospect Heights, Brooklyn